Easton is a village and civil parish in the English county of Norfolk.

History
Easton's name is of Anglo-Saxon origin and derives from the Old English for the eastern farmstead or settlement. 

In the Nineteenth Century, archaeologists discovered a Forth Century Roman hoard consisting of 4,000 coins, yet there is little evidence of any Roman settlement in the vicinity of Easton.

In the Domesday Book, Easton is listed as a settlement of 17 households in the hundred of Forehoe. In 1086, the village formed part of the East Anglian estates of Alan of Brittany.

Geography
According to 2011 Census, Easton has a population of 1,514 residents living in 609 households.

Easton falls within the constituency of South Norfolk and is represented at Parliament by Richard Bacon MP of the Conservative Party. For the purposes of local government, the parish falls within the district of South Norfolk.

St. Peter's Church
Easton's parish church is dedicated to Saint Peter and was left towerless after a collapse in the Eighteenth Century, which was subsequently replaced by a bellcote which also does not survive. St. Peter's was heavily restored in the Nineteenth Century by Richard Phipson with the large crucifix that hangs above the chancel arch originally hanging in St Gregory's Church, Norwich. The church font is a relic of the Thirteenth Century and is made out of Purbeck Marble.

Royal Norfolk Showground
The Royal Norfolk Showground is located within the parish and has acted as the venue for the Royal Norfolk Show since the 1950s, when the Royal Norfolk Agricultural Association purchased the ground. Today, the showground features a  open site with a  indoor Showground Arena. The showground continues to host events throughout the year.

Easton College

The parish is the site of Easton College, a large agricultural college offering courses in agriculture, horticulture and arboriculture. The college is centred around Easton Hall, an Eighteenth Century manor house with Grade II listed status.

Amenities
The majority of local children attend St. Peter's Church of England Primary School which is part of the Diocese of Norwich Academies Trust. In 2016, the school was awarded an 'Outstanding' rating by Ofsted.

Easton F.C. play home games at Easton College and play in the Anglian Combination League.

Notable Residents
 Cardinal Adam Easton (1328-1397)- English clergyman and Dean of York

War Memorial
Easton's war memorial takes the form of two plaques (one brass and one wooden) inside St. Peter's Church. The memorial lists the following names for the First World War:
 Pvt. Edgar Bennington (1876-1915), 1st Battalion, Essex Regiment
 Pvt. Alfred Pease (1892-1917), 1/5th Battalion, Loyal Regiment
 Pvt. Arthur Scarfe (1898-1917), 117th Company, Machine Gun Corps
 Pvt. Charles Burridge (1890-1914), 1st Battalion, Royal Norfolk Regiment
 Pvt. Frederick Burridge (1895-1915), 3rd Battalion, Royal Norfolk Regiment
 Pvt. Edgar O. Springall (d.1917), 12th (Yeomanry) Battalion, Royal Norfolk Regiment
 H. Bennington
 B. Hook
 E. Mortimer
 H. Mortimer

References

External links 

Villages in Norfolk
South Norfolk
Civil parishes in Norfolk